The Varada  River (Verada River) is a river in central Karnataka, India. It is a tributary of the Tungabhadra River.

Geography 
The Varada river originates near Vardamoola in Sagara of Karnataka. It flows through the Western Ghats and enters the central districts of Karnataka, (Haveri and Bellary). The river joins the Tungabhadra River at Galaganath.  

It is important to the wellbeing of the Kannada people along its course. Dams have been constructed along the river's course, providing water for irrigation and domestic purposes during summer. There are, however, no major irrigation projects on this river, although the government is considering one.

Cultural significance 
The river has divine association for Indians.

Shringarishi was once in deep penance, praying for forgiveness, from Lord vishnu, for committing the Bramhahatyadosha. Sriman Narayana appeared before him and poured gangajal on the rishi's head. This gangajal formed the Varada river.

Notes

Rivers of Karnataka
Geography of Haveri district
Geography of Bellary district
Rivers of India